Asia Muhammad and Maria Sanchez were the defending champions, but Muhammad chose to compete in the Indian Wells 125K event instead. Sanchez played alongside Monique Adamczak, but lost in the first round to Marie Bouzková and Renata Voráčová.

Kateryna Bondarenko and Sharon Fichman won the title, defeating Miyu Kato and Wang Yafan in the final, 4–6, 6–3, [10–7].

Seeds

Draw

Draw

References

External Links
 Main draw

Monterrey Open - Doubles
2020 Doubles